Conpulsion is the oldest gaming convention in Scotland, hosted by the Edinburgh University Roleplaying Society (GEAS) annually in Teviot Student Union, Edinburgh. It predominantly features role-playing games and live action role-playing games, but also includes wargames, board games, collectible card games, and non-collectible card games. The convention also has a strong focus on giving money to charity, in a similar vein to many Irish conventions.

History 
Conpulsion began in 1987 as Dungeon Aid, in a nod to Band Aid and Live Aid, with the intent to raise money for charity through gaming. After the first few years it was renamed Big Con, then later Conpulsion in 1995. After growing gradually in popularity through the late 80s and 90s the convention moved from The Pleasance buildings to Teviot in 1999, where it has been held since.

The 2005 event played host to the launch of Warhammer Fantasy Roleplay 2nd Edition.

In 2012, Conpulsion began "themeing" the event, starting with Apocalypse in reference to the Mayan Apocalypse predicted for December that year. This continued in 2013 with Espionage, 2014 with Innovation, and 2015 with Overboard. The 2015 closing ceremony announced the theme for 2016 would be Underworld.

Banquo Award 
Starting in 2004, and annually since 2007, Conpulsion has hosted the award ceremony for the Banquo Award, which recognises those encapsulating the "Spirit of Scottish Gaming".

Griffie Awards 
Since 2012, Conpulsion has annually presented two awards for the best RPG and best Board/Card Game released in the past year, voted on by attendees.

Sources

External links 
Official Website

Gaming conventions
University of Edinburgh